Kenneth Tsang Kong (5 October 1934 – 27 April 2022) was a Hong Kong actor. Tsang's career spanned 50 years and included a variety of acting roles. Tsang won the Best Supporting Actor Award at the 34th Hong Kong Film Awards in 2015.

Early life and education
Tsang attended high school in Wah Yan College, Hong Kong and then Wah Yan College, Kowloon. He attended McMurry College, Abilene, Texas for his freshman year and transferred to University of California, Berkeley, where he received a degree in architecture.

Career
Tsang returned to Hong Kong in the early 1960s as an architect but was unsatisfied by the work. His younger sister by 2 years, Jeanette Lin, was a film star at the time and provided Tsang with several connections in the industry which boosted his acting career.

Tsang's film debut was in the movie The Feud (1955) when he was 16, which was followed by a role in Who Isn't Romantic? (1956). In the mid-1960s, Tsang starred in detective films and classic kung fu movies with Hong Kong teen idols Connie Chan Po-chu and Josephine Siao. Tsang also appeared in a few Wong Fei-Hung movies in the late 1960s.

In 1986, Tsang worked as taxi cab owner, Ken, in John Woo's A Better Tomorrow. Subsequent collaborations with Woo included the role of Ken in A Better Tomorrow 2 in 1987, police officer Danny Lee's murdered partner in The Killer in 1989, and the strict adoptive father of Chow Yun-fat, Leslie Cheung and Cherie Chung in Once a Thief in 1991.

Tsang also filmed several Singaporean Chinese dramas during the 1990s, notably the 1995 epic The Teochew Family and The Unbeatables II in 1996.

Up to this point, Tsang had played roles in mainly Hong Kong movies. His first Hollywood film was The Replacement Killers (1998), also the Hollywood debut of co-star Chow Yun-fat. Tsang appeared alongside Chow once again in Anna and the King as well as Jackie Chan in Rush Hour 2. Tsang played General Moon in the James Bond film Die Another Day (2002), and he continued to appear in films from Hong Kong.

Personal life
Tsang had a younger sister,  (林翠), who was also a Hong Kong actress.

Tsang was married three times. His first wife was Chan Laidi (張萊娣), stage name Lan Di (藍娣), a Malaysian-Chinese and his co-star in The Big Circus and had a son. They divorced ten years later in 1979 and his son left to live with his mother. They have since resided in Vancouver, Canada. Chan died in 1991.

In 1980, Tsang married columnist and model Barbara Tang (邓拱璧) and had a daughter, Musette. Tsang and Tang divorced 10 years later in 1990.

In 1994 Tsang married Chiao Chiao, a Chinese-born Taiwanese actress.

Death
Tsang departed from Singapore and arrived in Hong Kong on 25 April 2022, where he began a seven-day Covid-19 quarantine at the Kowloon Hotel. On the evening of 26 April, he experienced chest discomfort and asked his family to deliver his medication for chronic hypertension, which they promptly did. However, the following day, he was found unresponsive in his room by health officials who arrived to conduct a PCR test, and paramedics pronounced him dead at the scene.

Filmography

Films 

Sources:

Television

Awards and nominations

References

External links
 
 Kenneth Tsang Kong at hkmdb.com

1934 births
2022 deaths
Hong Kong male film actors
UC Berkeley College of Environmental Design alumni
Hong Kong male television actors
Male actors from Shanghai
20th-century Hong Kong male actors
21st-century Hong Kong male actors
Participants in Chinese reality television series
McMurry University alumni
University of California, Berkeley alumni
Chinese male film actors
Chinese male television actors
20th-century Chinese male actors
21st-century Chinese male actors